Bruce Caldwell may refer to:

 Bruce Caldwell (American sportsman) (1906–1959), American baseball player and American football running back
  Bruce J. Caldwell (economist), American historian of economics
 Bruce Caldwell (rugby union) (1908–1975), rugby union player who represented Australia
 Bruce Edward Caldwell (born 1947), American bishop